Jawahar Lal Jaiswal is an Indian politician. He was elected to the Lok Sabha,  the lower house of the Parliament of India from Chandauli, Uttar Pradesh in 1999 as a member of the Samajwadi Party.

References

External links
 Official biographical sketch in Parliament of India website

1956 births
Living people
India MPs 1999–2004
Lok Sabha members from Uttar Pradesh
People from Chandauli district
Samajwadi Party politicians